Eric Allen Stonestreet (born September 9, 1971) is an American actor and comedian. He is best known for portraying Cameron Tucker in the ABC sitcom Modern Family, for which he received two Emmy Awards for Outstanding Supporting Actor in a Comedy Series out of three nominations. He first rose to prominence in a recurring role on CSI: Crime Scene Investigation. He has also appeared in films including Bad Teacher (2011), Identity Thief (2013), The Loft (2013), and Confirmation (2016), and provides the voice of Duke in the animated Secret Life of Pets film franchise (2016–2019).

Early life
Eric Allen Stonestreet was born in Kansas City, Kansas, on September 9, 1971, the son of teacher's aide Jamey Anne (née Ball) and retail business owner Vincent Stonestreet. He is of German descent. As a child, he wanted to become a clown, and created a clown character named Fizbo; by age 11, he was performing at younger children's birthday parties. He recalled in 2012, "I don't know where the name Fizbo came from. I do know one day that's what my dad was calling me and that's the name that I printed on my business cards." The name "Fizbo" was later used for a clown character he periodically played on Modern Family.

Stonestreet attended Piper High School and Kansas State University, where he was in the Pi Kappa Alpha fraternity, graduating with a degree in sociology in 1996. While there, he made his stage debut when he appeared in Prelude to a Kiss, for which he auditioned on a dare and won the smallest role. He later appeared in All My Sons and Twelfth Night, before studying improv at ImprovOlympic and The Second City Training Center in Chicago, then moved to Los Angeles to begin his professional acting career.

Career
Stonestreet played Cameron Tucker in ABC's Modern Family. He is also notable for his role as Ronnie Litre on CSI: Crime Scene Investigation. He also guest starred in television shows, such as Dharma & Greg,  ER, Malcolm in the Middle, The Mentalist, NCIS, Nip/Tuck, Party of Five, Spin City, The West Wing, Pushing Daisies, Greg the Bunny, Providence, Close to Home, Crossing Jordan, Bones, Monk, and American Horror Story. Early in his career Stonestreet was featured in Northwestern University's 1996 football TV commercial campaign as the "purple pride guy."

He made his film debut in Almost Famous, as desk clerk Sheldon. He also played Dr. Benson in Girls Will Be Girls, Ed the Trucker in The Island, and Courtney's Neighbor in Ninja Cheerleaders. In 2007, Stonestreet appeared in the short film "Vinny's Vault," which was produced during the reality show On the Lot. He also appeared in the movies Identity Thief as Big Chuck, and Bad Teacher as Kirk.

In his role as Cameron on Modern Family, Stonestreet earned three consecutive Primetime Emmy Award nominations for Outstanding Supporting Actor in a Comedy Series (2010, 2011 and 2012), winning the award in 2010 and 2012. He also received three Golden Globe Award nominations (2010, 2011 and 2013) for his work on the series.

In 2013, he appeared in a series of advertisements for Australian retail store Big W. In the fall of the same year, Stonestreet played the "Fan Coach" in the AT&T "Be A Fan" commercial series that ran during the college football season, in addition to appearing in a MasterCard/Stand Up 2 Cancer commercial as himself. In 2014, he performed in "Weird Al" Yankovic's music video for "Tacky," a parody of Pharrell's "Happy". In the same year he also starred in the remake of the Belgian thriller The Loft.  He regularly appears onstage at IO West improv Theatre in Los Angeles.

In 2017, Stonestreet hosted the ABC competition series The Toy Box.

In 2020, Stonestreet appeared as a guest judge for a taping of auditions for the fifteenth season of America's Got Talent, in place of Heidi Klum. In the same year he appeared in the music video for Ariana Grande and Justin Bieber's song "Stuck with U".

In March 2021, it was announced that Stonestreet would be hosting Domino Masters for Fox. The competition series premiered on March 9, 2022.

Personal life
Stonestreet began dating pediatric nurse Lindsay Schweitzer in June 2016, and they became engaged on August 22, 2021.

Unlike his Modern Family character, Stonestreet is not gay and has lightheartedly described himself as "openly straight". His Modern Family co-star and onscreen husband Jesse Tyler Ferguson, who is gay in real life, jokingly called him "gay-for-pay". Stonestreet supports LGBT causes, and denied Republican senator Rick Santorum's request to take a picture with him at the 2014 White House Correspondents' dinner due to Santorum's staunchly anti-gay platform.

A keen sports fan, Stonestreet supports the Kansas City Chiefs football team and joined the new ownership group of the Kansas City Royals baseball team in 2019. He has also driven the pace car at several NASCAR events. He often attends football games at his alma mater, Kansas State University, and stays active with several organizations there.

Filmography

Film

Television

Music videos

Specials

References

External links
 

1971 births
Living people
20th-century American male actors
21st-century American male actors
American male film actors
American male television actors
American people of German descent
American LGBT rights activists
Kansas State University alumni
Outstanding Performance by a Supporting Actor in a Comedy Series Primetime Emmy Award winners
Male actors from Kansas City, Kansas